Tibor Nyilasi (born 18 January 1955) is a retired Hungarian football player and manager. He signed with Ferencváros in 1972 and played there until transferring to Austria Wien in 1983. He made 70 appearances for the Hungary national team from 1975 to 1985, scoring 32 goals. He played in the 1978 FIFA World Cup (where he was sent off against Argentina) and the 1982 FIFA World Cup. After he retired as a player he was manager of Ferencváros. He has more recently also worked for the Hungarian Football Federation and is regularly appearing as a pundit on the Hungarian sports channel 'Sport TV'.

Honours

Club
Ferencvárosi
 Nemzeti Bajnokság I: 1975–76, 1980–81,
 Hungarian Cup: 1973–74, 1975–76, 1977–78
 Cup Winners' Cup: Runner-up 1974–75

Austria Wien
 Austrian Bundesliga: 1983–84, 1984–85, 1985–86
 Austrian Cup: 1985–86

Individual
 Hungarian Top Scorer: 1980–81
 European Silver Boot: 1980–81
 UEFA Cup Top Scorer: 1983–84
 Austrian Top Scorer: 1983–84

Manager
Ferencvárosi
 Nemzeti Bajnokság I: 1991–92
 Hungarian Cup:  1990–91, 1992–93, 1993–94

Sources
 Ki kicsoda a magyar sportéletben?, II. kötet (I–R). Szekszárd, Babits Kiadó, 1995, p. 395., 
 Nagy Béla: Fradisták (Sportpropaganda, 1981) 
 Nagy Béla: Fradi futballkönyv (Sportpropaganda, 1985) 
 Rejtő László–Lukács László–Szepesi György: Felejthetetlen 90 percek (Sportkiadó, 1977) 
 Hoppe Pál – Szabó Ferenc: A Nyíl (Budapest, 1984)
 Nagy Béla: Nyilasi album (Budapest, 2003)
His stats at Austria Wien

References

1955 births
Living people
People from Várpalota
Hungarian footballers
Hungary international footballers
Hungarian football managers
1978 FIFA World Cup players
1982 FIFA World Cup players
Ferencvárosi TC footballers
FK Austria Wien players
Austrian Football Bundesliga players
Hungarian expatriate footballers
Expatriate footballers in Austria
Hungarian expatriate sportspeople in Austria
Ferencvárosi TC managers
Association football midfielders
Nemzeti Bajnokság I managers
Sportspeople from Veszprém County